There are many conventions used in the robotics research field. This article summarises these conventions.

Line representations

Lines are very important in robotics because:
 They model joint axes: a revolute joint makes any connected  rigid body rotate about the line of its axis; a prismatic joint makes the connected rigid body translate along its axis line.
 They model edges of the polyhedral objects used in many task planners or sensor processing modules.
 They are needed for shortest distance calculation between robots and obstacles

Non-minimal vector coordinates
A line  is completely defined by the ordered set of two vectors:
 a point vector , indicating the position of an arbitrary point on 
 one free direction vector , giving the line a direction as well as a sense.

Each point  on the line is given a parameter value  that satisfies:
. The representation  is not minimal, because it uses six parameters for only four degrees of freedom. The following two constraints apply:
 The direction vector  can be chosen to be a unit vector
 the point vector  can be chosen to be the point on the line that is nearest the origin. So  is orthogonal to

Plücker coordinates
Arthur Cayley and Julius Plücker introduced an alternative representation using two free vectors. This representation was finally named after Plücker.
( is independent of which point  on the line is chosen!)
 The advantage of the Plücker coordinates is that they are homogeneous.
 A line in Plücker coordinates has still four out of six independent parameters, so it is not a minimal representation. The two constraints on the six Plücker coordinates are
 the homogeneity constraint
 the orthogonality constraint

Minimal line representation
A line representation is minimal if it uses four parameters, which is the minimum needed to represent all possible lines in the Euclidean Space (E³).

Denavit–Hartenberg line coordinates

Jaques Denavit and Richard S. Hartenberg presented the first minimal representation for a line which is now widely used. The common normal between two lines was the main geometric concept that allowed Denavit and Hartenberg to find a minimal representation.  Engineers use the Denavit–Hartenberg convention(D–H) to help them describe the positions of links and joints unambiguously.  Every link gets its own coordinate system.  There are a few rules to consider in choosing the coordinate system:
 the -axis is in the direction of the joint axis
 the -axis is parallel to the common normal: If there is no unique common normal (parallel  axes), then  (below) is a free parameter.
 the -axis follows from the - and -axis by choosing it to be a right-handed coordinate system.

Once the coordinate frames are determined, inter-link transformations are uniquely described by the following four parameters:
 : angle about previous , from old  to new 
 : offset along previous  to the common normal
 : length of the common normal (aka , but if using this notation, do not confuse with ).  Assuming a revolute joint, this is the radius about previous .
 : angle about common normal, from old  axis to new  axis

Hayati–Roberts line coordinates
The Hayati–Roberts line representation, denoted , is another minimal line representation, with parameters:
This requirement eliminates the need for a  component, since 
The reference frame on this normal plane has the same origin as the world reference frame, and its  and  frame axes are images of the world frame's  and  axes through parallel projection along the line.

This representation is unique for a directed line.

Product of exponentials formula
The product of exponentials formula represents the kinematics of an open-chain mechanism as the product of exponentials of twists, and may be used to describe a series of revolute, prismatic, and helical joints.

See also
 List of basic robotics topics
 Denavit–Hartenberg parameters

References

 Giovanni Legnani, Federico Casolo, Paolo Righettini and Bruno Zappa A homogeneous matrix approach to 3D kinematics and dynamics — I. Theory Mechanism and Machine Theory, Volume 31, Issue 5, July 1996, Pages 573–587
 Giovanni Legnani, Federico Casalo, Paolo Righettini and Bruno Zappa A homogeneous matrix approach to 3D kinematics and dynamics—II. Applications to chains of rigid bodies and serial manipulators Mechanism and Machine Theory, Volume 31, Issue 5, July 1996, Pages 589–605
 A. Bottema and B. Roth. Theoretical Kinematics. Dover Books on Engineering. Dover Publications, Inc. Mineola, NY, 1990
 A. Cayley. On a new analytical representation of curves in space. Quarterly Journal of Pure and Applied Mathematics,3:225–236,1860
 K.H. Hunt. Kinematic Geometry of Mechanisms. Oxford Science Publications, Oxford, England, 2n edition, 1990
 J. Plücker. On a new geometry of space. Philosophical Transactions of the Royal Society of London, 155:725–791, 1865
 J. Plücker. Fundamental views regarding mechanics. Philosophical Transactions of the Royal Society of London, 156:361–380, 1866
 J. Denavit and R.S. Hartenberg. A kinematic notation for lower-pair mechanisms based on matrices. Trans ASME J. Appl. Mech, 23:215–221,1955
 R.S. HartenBerg and J. Denavit Kinematic synthesis of linkages McGraw–Hill, New York, NY, 1964
 R. Bernhardt and S.L. Albright. Robot Calibration, Chapman & Hall, 1993
 S.A. Hayati and M. Mirmirani. Improving the absolute positioning accuracy of robot manipulators. J. Robotic Systems, 2(4):397–441, 1985
 K.S. Roberts. A new representation for a line. In Proceedings of the Conference on Computer Vision and Pattern Recognition, pages 635–640, Ann Arbor, MI, 1988

External links 
 Denavit Hartenburg Convention  Computational Software, Wolfram.com 'Math Source' Author: Jason Desjardins 2002

Robotics